DAV Public School, Hehal is an educational institution in Ranchi city of Jharkhand, India. It is a co-educational school featuring education from the Kindergarten to Senior Secondary level. It is affiliated with the Central Board of Secondary Education, New Delhi, and is managed by D.A.V. College Managing Committee.

Campus 
The school consists of separate campuses for kindergarten, primary, secondary and higher secondary levels. The kindergarten and junior wing are located at the West End Park. The middle and senior wings are located at Itki Road where the head office of the school is located.

History 
The school started off with a campus located at Nawagarh House (in Ranchi) in 1988. Later, campus was located at Itki Road and West End Park. The school now operates with its new campus at West End Park, and a campus at Itki Road. The old campus at West End Park and Nawagarh House are obsolete now.

Alumni
 Anand Mohan, IRTS
 Khyati Mangla, Television actress

See also
Education in India
CBSE

References

External links 
 

Private schools in Jharkhand
High schools and secondary schools in Jharkhand
Schools in Ranchi
Schools affiliated with the Arya Samaj
Educational institutions established in 1972
1972 establishments in Bihar